Maidens Hotel, Delhi, an Oberoi Group hotel, originally known as Maiden's Metropolitan Hotel, is a heritage hotel in the Civil Lines area of Delhi, India. It was opened in 1903 in its present location.

History

The original hotel (Metropolitan Hotel) was jointly run by two Englishmen brothers, the Maiden brothers, from 1894 onwards, and in its present location by one of them, J. Maiden, from 1903 onwards. In the early 20th century, the hotel was widely considered to be the best hotel in Delhi.  At the time of the 1903 Coronation Durbar held by Lord Curzon to celebrate the coronation of Edward VII as Emperor of India, the Metropolitan Hotel was the most sought after hotel accommodation in Delhi and the most expensive. The hotel was originally painted in Red in its early days.

Notes

References

See also
Ludlow Castle, Delhi
List of hotels in Delhi

External links
 Maidens Hotel, website
 Most expensive hotel in India

Hotels in Delhi
The Oberoi Group
Heritage hotels in India
North Delhi district
Indian companies established in 1903
Hotel buildings completed in 1903
Hotels established in 1903
20th-century architecture in India